The Iowa Senate is the upper house of the Iowa General Assembly, United States. There are 50 seats in the Iowa Senate, representing 50 single-member districts across the state of Iowa with populations of approximately 60,927 per constituency, . Each Senate district is composed of two House districts. The Senate meets at the Iowa State Capitol in Des Moines.

Unlike the lower house, the Iowa House of Representatives, senators serve four-year terms, with no term limits. Terms are staggered so that half the Senate is up for reelection every two years.

Leadership
The President of the Senate presides over the body, whose powers include referring bills to committee, recognizing members during debate, and making procedural rulings. Unlike the more powerful Speaker of the Iowa House of Representatives, the Senate President cannot appoint committee chairmanships or shuffle committee memberships. The Lieutenant Governor of Iowa was the presiding officer of the Senate until 1988, when an amendment to the Constitution of Iowa was passed in a referendum (effective from 1991). The other partisan Senate leadership positions, such as the Majority and Minority leaders, are elected by their respective party caucuses to head their parties in the chamber.

The President of the Senate is Republican Amy Sinclair of the 12th District. The Majority Leader is Republican Jack Whitver of the 19th District. The Minority Leader is Democrat Zach Wahls of the 37th District.

Committee leadership 

*All chairs and vice chairs are members of the Republican Party of Iowa. All ranking members are members of the Democratic Party of Iowa.

Current composition

Past notable members

 Samuel J. Kirkwood, two-time governor of Iowa (1860–64, 1876–77); two time U.S. senator (1866–67), (1877–81); U.S. secretary of the interior (1881–82)
 George G. Wright, U.S. senator from 1871 to 1877
 Tom Vilsack, Incumbent United States secretary of agriculture since 2021 and from 2009 to 2017, former governor of Iowa from 1999 to 2007, and briefly Democratic candidate for president of the United States in 2008
 George A. Wilson, governor of Iowa from 1939 to 1943
 Patty Judge, former lieutenant governor of Iowa (2007–2011), former Iowa secretary of agriculture (1999–2007)
 Steve King, former U.S. representative for Iowa's 4th congressional district (2003–2021)
 Joni Ernst, Incumbent U.S. senator, since 2015
 Kim Reynolds, Incumbent governor of Iowa since 2017, former lieutenant governor of Iowa (2011–2017)
 Randy Feenstra, Incumbent U.S. representative for Iowa's 4th congressional district since 2021
 Mariannette Miller-Meeks, U.S. representative for Iowa's 2nd congressional district since 2021 and Republican nominee for Iowa's 2nd congressional district in 2008, 2010, and 2014

Past composition of the Senate

See also
List of current members of the Iowa Senate
Iowa House of Representatives

References

External links

Iowa Legislature official government website

Iowa Senate Democrats
Iowa Senate Republicans
Current Iowa Senators

1846 establishments in Iowa
State upper houses in the United States